Andreas Sander (born 13 June 1989) is a German World Cup alpine ski racer. He specializes in the speed events of downhill and super-G.

Career

On 13 March 2008, Sander made his World Cup debut in the Bormio Super-G. On 18 December 2010, he scored his first World Cup points in the Val Gardena downhill, finishing in 28th place. He competed at the 2011 World Championships in Garmisch-Partenkirchen, Germany, in the Super-G and Downhill. He competed at the 2015 World Championships in Beaver Creek, USA, in the super-G, downhill, and combined. On 29 December 2015, he scored his first Top 10 World Cup result in the Santa Caterina Downhill, finishing in 10th place. 

Sander won the silver medal in the downhill at the World Championships in 2021 at Cortina d'Ampezzo. His first World Cup podium came in March 2023 with a runner-up finish in the super-G at Aspen.

World Cup results

Season standings

Top five results
 0 wins
 1 podium (1 SG); 7 top fives (6 SG, 1 DH); 31 top tens

World Championship results

Olympic Games results

References

External links

1989 births
German male alpine skiers
Living people
People from Schwelm
Sportspeople from Arnsberg (region)
Olympic alpine skiers of Germany
Alpine skiers at the 2018 Winter Olympics
Alpine skiers at the 2022 Winter Olympics
21st-century German people